Sophienlund is a 1943 German comedy film directed by Heinz Rühmann and starring Harry Liedtke, Käthe Haack and Hannelore Schroth. It was based on a play of the same title by Helmut Weiss and Fritz von Woedtke. It was shot at the Babelsberg Studios in Berlin and on location around the baroque Buckow Castle. The film's sets were designed by the art director Willi Herrmann . The 1956 Austrian film Engagement at Wolfgangsee was an Agfacolor remake directed by Helmut Weiss.

Synopsis
When the Eckberg family gather at the manor house Sophienlund it transpires that two twin brothers are not really children of the house, and therefore one of them can marry the girl he thought to be his sister.

Cast
 Harry Liedtke as 	Erick Eckberg
 Käthe Haack as Sigrid Eckberg
 Hannelore Schroth as 	Gabriele Eckberg
 Robert Tessen as Michael Eckberg
 Fritz Wagner as 	Knut Eckberg
 Stina Sorbon as Birgit Lundquist 
 Hans Quest as Jürgen
 Jeanette Bethge as 	Selma
 Clemens Hasse as Kramer

References

Bibliography 
 Goble, Alan. The Complete Index to Literary Sources in Film. Walter de Gruyter, 1999.

External links 
 

1943 films
Films of Nazi Germany
German comedy films
1943 comedy films
1940s German-language films
Terra Film films
Films shot at Babelsberg Studios
German films based on plays
Films directed by Heinz Rühmann
1940s German films